Kentucky Route 5 (KY 5) is an  north–south state highway in eastern Kentucky.

Route description
KY 5 begins at a junction with U.S. Route 60 at Princess, Kentucky in Boyd County. The route continues through Bellefonte in Greenup County to terminate at U.S. Route 23 back in Boyd County in between Ashland and Russell.

Major intersections

References

External links

 
 

0005
0005
0005